The Humans is a one-act play written by Stephen Karam. The play opened on Broadway in 2016 after an engagement Off-Broadway in 2015. The Humans was a finalist for the 2016 Pulitzer Prize for Drama and won the 2016 Tony Award for Best Play.

Synopsis
At Thanksgiving, the Blake family gathers at the run-down Manhattan apartment in Chinatown of Brigid Blake
and her boyfriend Richard. Brigid's parents, Erik Blake and Deirdre Blake, arrive from their home in Scranton, Pennsylvania, to have dinner with Brigid, Richard and Aimee, their other adult daughter. Brigid is a musician and Aimee is a lawyer living in Philadelphia. Aimee has recently broken up with her girlfriend and has developed an intestinal ailment. Also present is Erik's mother Fiona "Momo", who has Alzheimer's disease. The parents are unhappy that their daughters have left home and have abandoned their religion. The family members must deal with "aging, illness, and a changing economy".

Productions
The play had its world premiere at the American Theater Company in Chicago, Illinois, in November 2014, directed by PJ Paparelli. Chris Jones, in his review for the Chicago Tribune, wrote: "kind, warm, beautifully observed and deeply moving new play, a celebration of working-class familial imperfection and affection and a game-changing work for this gifted young playwright."

The Humans opened Off-Broadway at the Laura Pels Theatre on September 30, 2015, in previews, and officially on October 25, 2015, in a limited run produced by the Roundabout Theatre Company, with positive reviews, and ran until January 3, 2016. It transferred to Broadway at the Helen Hayes Theatre, opening on February 18, 2016, and closing on July 24, 2016. The play then transferred to the Schoenfeld Theatre, re-opening on August 9, 2016. (The Helen Hayes had major renovations starting in August 2016.) The play closed its Broadway engagement on January 15, 2017.

Directed by Joe Mantello, the Off-Broadway cast featured Cassie Beck (Aimee), Reed Birney (Erik), Jayne Houdyshell (Deirdre), Lauren Klein (Fiona "Momo" Blake), Arian Moayed (Richard), and Sarah Steele (Brigid). While off-Broadway, the script won the 2016 Obie Awards for Karam's playwriting and Houdyshell's performance. The Off-Broadway cast moved to Broadway.

The Pittsburgh Public Theater staged The Humans from November 9 to December 10, 2017, directed by Pamela Berlin; it was admiringly reviewed in the Pittsburgh Post-Gazette. Artists Repertory Theatre, located in Portland, Oregon, staged it from November 19 to December 17.

The play embarked on a limited US national tour, starting in November 2017 at the Seattle Repertory Theatre. The tour cast featured Richard Thomas as Erik, Pamela Reed as Deirdre, Daisy Eagan as Brigid, Lauren Klein as Momo, Therese Plaehn as Aimee and Luis Vega as Richard. The tour concluded on July 29, 2018, at the Ahmanson Theatre in Los Angeles.

The play opened in London at the Hampstead Theatre in September 2018 and closed on October 13, 2018. The Broadway cast reprise their roles, as does the director Mantello.

Off the Dock Players produced the play in Sandwich, New Hampshire. It opened on February 14, 2020, and closed on February 23. The production was directed by Nancy Blaine and starred Hank Offinger, Rebecca Cole, Ashley Bullard, Abe Garon, Marena Harris, and Lisa Thompson.

Critical response
In his review of the Broadway production in The New York Times, Charles Isherwood called it the "finest new play of the Broadway season so far" and praised the cast, direction, and the set "... that perfectly captures the unsettled atmosphere the writing so deftly establishes."

Jesse Green, reviewing the Broadway production for Vulture, wrote: "With its irrational layout and strange, sickening noises, the apartment, as the stage directions put it, is 'effortlessly uncanny,' as is the play itself ... It is still the most, well, human play I’ve ever seen about fear and disappointment and the attachments that transcend them."

The Pulitzer Prize committee called the play a “profoundly affecting drama that sketches the psychological and emotional contours of an average American family."

Awards and nominations

Original Off-Broadway production

Original Broadway production

Film adaptation

A film adaptation of the play, written and directed by Karam, began production in September 2019. It was released in November 2021.

References

External links
 
 

2014 plays
Plays by Stephen Karam
Plays set in New York City
Broadway plays
Drama Desk Award-winning plays
Obie Award-winning plays
New York Drama Critics' Circle Award winners
Thanksgiving fiction